Trinity is a given name of English origin that is derived from the Christian doctrine of the Trinity, or one God in three persons. It has been a well used name for girls in the United States in recent years.

Notes